Syrian Americans are Americans of Syrian descent or background. The first significant wave of Syrian immigrants to arrive in the United States began in the 1880s. Many of the earliest Syrian Americans settled in New York City, Boston, and Detroit. Immigration from Syria to the United States suffered a long hiatus after the United States Congress passed the Immigration Act of 1924, which restricted immigration. More than 40 years later, the Immigration Act of 1965, abolished the quotas and immigration from Syria to the United States saw a surge. An estimated 64,600 Syrians immigrated to the United States between 1961 and 2000. Memphis, Tennessee.

The overwhelming majority of Syrian immigrants to the U.S. from 1880 to 1960 were Christian, a minority were Jewish, whereas Muslim Syrians arrived in the United States chiefly after 1965. According to the United States 2016 Census, there were 187,331 Americans who claimed Syrian ancestry, about 12% of the Arab population in the United States. There are also sizeable minority populations from Syria in the U.S. including Jews, Kurds, Armenians, Assyrians, and Circassians.

History 

The earliest known Syrian and first Arab to die for the United States was Private Nathan Badeen, an immigrant from Ottoman Syria who died fighting British forces during the American Revolutionary War on May 23, 1776, a month and a half prior to American independence. The first major wave of Syrian immigrants arrived in the United States from Ottoman Syria in the period between 1889 and 1914. A small number were also Palestinians. According to historian Philip Hitti, approximately 90,000 "Syrians" arrived in the United States between 1899 and 1919. An estimated 1,000 official entries per year came from the governorates of Damascus and Aleppo, which are governorates in modern-day Syria, in the period between 1900 and 1916. Early immigrants settled mainly in Eastern United States, in the cities of New York, Boston, Detroit, Cleveland, and the Paterson, New Jersey, area. Until 1899, all migrants from the Ottoman Empire registered as "Turks" when entering the US. When "Syrian" became available as a designation at the turn of the 20th century., 3,708 migrants from the region registered as Syrians, only 28 as Turks. In the 1920s, the majority of immigrants from Mount Lebanon began to refer to themselves as Lebanese instead of "Syrians".

Syrians, like most immigrants to the United States, were motivated to pursue the American Dream of economic success. Many Christian Syrians had immigrated to the United States seeking religious freedom and an escape from Ottoman hegemony, and to escape the massacres and bloody conflicts that targeted Christians in particular, after the 1860 Mount Lebanon civil war and the massacres of 1840 and 1845 and the Assyrian genocide. Thousands of immigrants returned to Syria after making money in the United States; these immigrants told tales which inspired further waves of immigrants. Many settlers also sent for their relatives.

Although the number of Syrian immigrants was not sizable, the Ottoman government set constraints on emigration in order to maintain its populace in Greater Syria. The United States Congress passed the Immigration Act of 1924, which greatly reduced Syrian immigration to the United States. However, the quotas were annulled by the Immigration Act of 1965, which opened the doors again to Syrian immigrants. 4,600 Syrians immigrated to the United States in the mid-1960s. Due to the Arab-Israeli and religious conflicts in Syria during this period, many Syrians immigrated to the United States seeking a democratic haven, where they could live in freedom without political suppression. An estimated 64,600 Syrians immigrated to the United States in the period between 1961 and 2000, of which ten percent have been admitted under the refugee acts. Between 2011 and 2015, the US received 1,500 Syrian refugees fleeing the 
war in their country. In 2016, the country received 10,000 more refugees. However, the Trump administration banned Syrian migration to the US, as well as the migration of any refugee in 2017.

According to the 2000 United States census, there are 142,897 Americans of Syrian ancestry living in the United States. New York City has the highest concentration of Syrian Americans in the United States. Other urban areas, including Paterson, New Jersey, Allentown, Boston, Cleveland, Dearborn, New Orleans, Toledo, Cedar Rapids, and Houston have large Syrian populations. Syrian Americans are also numerous in Southern California (i.e. the Los Angeles and San Diego areas) and Arizona, many are descendants of farm laborers invited with their farm skills to irrigate the deserts in the early 20th century. Many recent Syrian immigrants are medical doctors who studied at Damascus and Aleppo Universities and pursued their residencies and fellowships in the United States.

Assimilation

Pre-1965

The traditional clothing of the first Syrian immigrants in the United States, along with their occupation as peddlers, led to some xenophobia. Scholars such as Oswaldo Truzzi have speculated that this work ultimately helped Syrian integration into the US by accelerating cultural contact and English language skills. It has been estimated that nearly 80% of first generation Syrian women worked as street merchants. They and their children were often negatively stigmatized as "street Arabs" or inaccurately assumed to be unmarried mothers or prostitutes. In 1907, Congressman John L. Burnett called Syrians "the most undesirable of the undesirable peoples of Asia Minor" and such stigmas appear again in a 1929 survey in Boston that associated Syrians with "lying and deception."

In 1890, the writer Jacob Riis wrote How the Other Half Lives, a book focused on Syrian children, representing the children as pitiful but dangerous. In 1899, the National Conference on Charities declared children engaged in the street market to be equivalent to begging, opening the possibility that women street merchants with children could be deported.

However, Syrians reacted quickly to assimilate fully into their new culture. Immigrants anglicized their names, adopted the English language and common Christian denominations. Syrians did not congregate in urban enclaves; many of the immigrants who had worked as peddlers were able to interact with Americans on a daily basis. Aside from negative stigmas, the first generation of Syrian migrants also faced romantic stereotyping for their Christian origins. The migrant and writer Mary Amyuni described being advised to describe her home as "the Holy Land" to ease her integration into the United States: "hold up the rosaries and crosses first; say they are from the Holy Land because Americans are very religious." Writers such as Horatio Alger and M.A. Howe contributed to the understanding of Syrian migrants as "redeemable peasants." This view pressured Syrians to reject old ways of life as "un-American" and to "accept new ideals."

Immigrant writers often balanced an adopted culture with a home culture, such as in Ameen Rihani's 1911 "The Book of Khalid," which revolved around an imagined Arabic text inscribed with images of skyscrapers and pyramids. Others argued for the possibility of both identities in public discourse, including Syrian academic Abbas Bajjani, who wrote that "inhabiting two separate worlds—physically and socially—was not only possible but actually desirable, since it was the only hope for the salvation, edification, and modernization of “Syria.”

Additionally, military service during World War I and World War II helped accelerate assimilation. Assimilation of early Syrian immigrants was so successful that it has become difficult to recognize the ancestors of many families which have become completely Americanized.

Religion 

Christian Syrians arrived in the United States in the late 19th century. Most Christian Syrian Americans are Greek Orthodox and Syriac Orthodox. There are also many Catholic Syrian Americans; most branches of Catholicism are of the Eastern rite, such as Maronite Catholics, Melkite Greek Catholics, Armenian Catholics, Syrian Catholics, and the Assyrian Chaldean Catholics. A few Christian Syrian Americans are Protestant. There are also members of the Assyrian Church of the East and Ancient Church of the East. The first Syrian American church was founded in Brooklyn, New York in 1895 by Saint Raphael of Brooklyn. There are currently hundreds of Eastern Orthodox churches and missions in the United States.

The first wave of Syrian religious communities in the United States established ninety Maronite, Melkite, and Syrian Orthodox churches across the country by 1920, many establishing firm contrasts between themselves and American Christian faiths such as the Episcopalians or Catholics. Historian Naff writes that as a broad global diaspora threatened the Syrian identity, the preservation of its religious traditions became increasingly important.

Muslim Syrians arrived in the United States chiefly after 1965. The largest sect in Islam is the Sunni sect, forming 74% of the Muslim Syrian population.  of whom 12% are ethnic Kurds and 5% Turks. The second largest sect in Islam in Syria is the Alawite sect, a religious sect that originated in Shia Islam but separated from other Shiite Islam groups in the ninth and tenth centuries.

Druze form the third largest sect in Syria, which is a relatively small esoteric monotheistic religious sect. Early Syrian immigrants included Druze peddlers. The United States is the second largest home of Druze communities outside Western Asia after Venezuela (60,000). According to some estimates, there are about 30,000 to 50,000 Druze in the United States, with the largest concentration in Southern California. Most Druze immigrated to the U.S. from Lebanon and Syria.

Syrian Jews first arrived in the United States around 1908 and settled mostly in New York. Initially they lived on the Lower East Side; later settlements were in Bensonhurst and Ocean Parkway in Flatbush, Brooklyn. The Syrian Jewish community estimates its population at around 50,000. Jewish organizations have assisted Syrian refugees by providing various services in Northern New Jersey.

Politics 
Early Syrian Americans were not involved politically. Business owners were usually Republican, meanwhile labor workers were usually Democrats. Second generation Syrian Americans were the first to be elected for political roles. In light of the Arab–Israeli conflict, many Syrian Americans tried to affect American foreign policy by joining Arab political groups in the United States. In the early 1970s, the National Association of Arab-Americans was formed to negate the stereotypes commonly associated with Arabs in American media. Syrian Americans were also part of the Arab American Institute, established in 1985, which supports and promotes Arab American candidates, or candidates commiserative with Arabs and Arab Americans, for office. Mitch Daniels, who served as Governor of Indiana from 2005 to 2013, is a descendant of Syrian immigrants with relatives in Homs.

Employment 

The majority of the early Syrian immigrants arrived in the United States seeking better jobs; they usually engaged in basic commerce, especially peddling. Syrian American peddlers found their jobs comfortable since peddling required little training and mediocre vocabulary. Syrian American peddlers served as the distribution medium for the products of small manufacturers. Syrian peddlers traded mostly in dry goods, primarily clothing. Networks of Syrian traders and peddlers across the United States aided the distribution of Syrian settlements; by 1902, Syrians could be found working in Seattle, Washington. Most of these peddlers were successful, and, with time, and after raising enough capital, some became importers and wholesalers, recruiting newcomers and supplying them with merchandise. By 1908, there were 3,000 Syrian-owned businesses in the United States. By 1910, the first Syrian millionaires had emerged.

Syrian Americans gradually started to work in various métiers; many worked as physicians, lawyers, and engineers. Many Syrian Americans also worked in the bustling auto industry, bringing about large Syrian American gatherings in areas like Dearborn, Michigan. Later Syrian emigrants served in fields like banking, medicine, and computer science. Syrian Americans have a different occupational distribution than all Americans. According to the 2000 census, 42% of the Syrian Americans worked in management and professional occupations, compared with 34% of their counterparts in the total population; additionally, more Syrian Americans worked in sales than all American workers. However, Syrian Americans worked less in the other work domains like farming, transportation, construction, etc. than all American workers. According to the American Medical Association (AMA) and the Syrian American Medical Society (SAMS), which represents American health care providers of Syrian descent, there are estimated 4000 Syrian physicians practicing in the United States representing 0.4% of the health workforce and 1.6% of international medical graduates. However the reported number of Syrian American physicians does not include the second and third generation of Syrian descent, therefore it is estimated that 10,000 Syrian American physicians practice in the United States.

The median household income for Syrian families is higher than the national earning median; employed Syrian men earned an average $46,058 per year, compared with $37,057 for all Americans and $41,687 for Arab Americans. Syrian American families also had a higher median income than all families and lower poverty rates than those of the general population.

Culture

Cuisine 

Syrians consider eating an important aspect of social life. There are many Syrian dishes which have become popular in the United States. Unlike many Western foods, Syrian foods take more time to cook, are less expensive and usually more healthy. Pita bread (khubz), which is round flat bread, and hummus, a dip made of ground chickpeas, sesame tahini, lemon juice, and garlic, are two popular Syrian foods. Baba ghanoush, or eggplant spreads, is also a dish made by Syrians. Popular Syrian salads include tabbouleh and fattoush. The Syrian cuisine includes other dishes like stuffed zucchini (mahshe), dolma, kebab, kibbeh, kibbeh nayyeh, mujaddara, shawarma, and shanklish. Syrians often serve selections of appetizers, known as meze, before the main course. Za'atar, minced beef, and cheese manakish are popular hors d'œuvre. Syrians are also well known for their cheese. A popular Syrian drink is the arak beverage. One of the popular desserts made by Syrians is the baklava, which is made of filo pastry filled with chopped nuts and soaked in honey.  One of the first Syrian-Americans to popularize Levantine cuisine was Helen Corey, who published the bestselling The Art of Syrian Cookery in 1962.

Music 

Syrian music includes several genres and styles of music ranging from Arab classical to Arabic pop music and from secular to sacred music. Syrian music is characterized by an emphasis on melody and rhythm, as opposed to harmony. There are some genres of Syrian music that are polyphonic, but typically, most Syrian and Arabic music is homophonic. Syrian music is also characterized by the predominance of vocal music. The prototypical Arabic music ensemble in Egypt and Syria is known as the takht, and relies on a number of musical instruments that represent a standardized tone system, and are played with generally standardized performance techniques, thus displaying similar details in construction and design. Such musical instruments include the oud, kanun, rabab, ney, violin, riq, and tableh. The Jews of Syria sang pizmonim.

Modern Syrian music has incorporated instruments from the West, including the electric guitar, cello, double bass, and oboe, and incorporated influences from jazz and other foreign musical styles.

Traditional clothing 
Traditional dress is not very common with Syrian Americans, and even native Syrians; modern Western clothing is conventional in both Syria and the United States. Ethnic dance performers wear a shirwal, which are loose, baggy pants with an elastic waist. Some Muslim Syrian women wear a hijab, which is a headscarf worn by Muslim and orthodox Christian women to cover their hair.  There are various styles of hijab.

Holidays 
Syrian Americans celebrate many religious holidays, with Christian Syrian Americans celebrating most of the Christian holidays that are already celebrated in the United States, but in addition to a few others or at different times. For example, They celebrate Christmas and Easter, but since most Syrians are Eastern Orthodox, they celebrate Easter on a different Sunday from most other Americans, and various Saints' days.

Syrian American Jews celebrate the Jewish holidays, such as Rosh Hashanah, Yom Kippur, Sukkot, Purim, Passover, and Shavuot. Few Syrians celebrate Syria's independence day, April 17. As American citizens, many Syrians celebrate American holidays like Memorial Day, Independence Day, and Thanksgiving Day.

Muslim Syrian Americans celebrate three main Muslim holidays: Ramadan, Eid ul-Fitr (Lesser Bairam), and Eid ul-Adha (Greater Bairam). Ramadan is the ninth month of the Islamic year, during which Muslims fast from dawn to sunset; Muslims resort to self-discipline to cleanse themselves spiritually. After Ramadan is over, Muslims celebrate Eid ul-Fitr, when Muslims break their fasting and revel exuberantly. Muslims also celebrate Eid ul-Adha (which means The Festival of Sacrifice) 70 days after at the end of the Islamic year, a holiday which is held along with the annual pilgrimage to Mecca, Hajj.

Dating and marriage 
Many Syrian Americans prefer traditional relationships over casual dating. For example, The Muslims can only date after completing their marriage contact, known as kitabt al-kitab (Arabic: كتابة الكتاب, which means "writing the book" in English), a period that ranges from a few months to a year or more to get used to living with one another. After this time period, a wedding takes place and fulfills the marriage. Muslims tend to marry other Muslims only, but can tend to be dynamic in terms of other ethnic groups; Unable to find other suitable Muslim Syrian Americans, many Muslim Syrian American have married other Muslim Americans.

Syrian American marriages are usually very strong; this is reflected by the low divorce rates among Syrian Americans, which are below the average rates in the United States. Generally, Syrian American partners tend to have more children than average American partners; Syrian American partners also tend to have children at early stages of their marriages. According to the United States 2000 Census, almost 62% of Syrian American households were married-couple households.

Education 

Syrian Americans, including the earliest immigrants, have always placed a high premium on education. Like many other Americans, Syrian Americans view education as a necessity. Generally, Syrian and other Arab Americans are more highly educated than the average American. In the 2000 census it was reported that the proportion of Syrian Americans to achieve a bachelor's degree or higher is one and a half times that of the total American population. Many Syrian Americans now work as engineers, scientists, pharmacists, and physicians.

Language 
While some may speak the formal Literary Arabic, many Syrians speak Syrian Arabic, a dialect which belongs to the Levantine Arabic family of dialects. There are also sub-dialects in Syrian Arabic; for example, people from Aleppo have a distinct and distinguishable accent, one that differs considerably from that of people from Homs or Al-Hasakah. Syrians can usually comprehend and understand the dialects of most Arabs, especially those who speak any form of Levantine Arabic.

Many old Syrian American families have lost their linguistic traditions because many parents do not teach their children Arabic. Newer immigrants, however, maintain their language traditions. The 2000 census shows that 79.9% of Syrian Americans speak English "very well". Throughout the United States, there are schools which offer Arabic language classes; there are also some Eastern Orthodox churches which hold Arabic services.

Notable people 

Sometimes some confusion occurs between Greater Syria and the modern Syria when determining the place of origin of the earliest Syrian Americans. However, the following list comprises notable Americans who are originally people of modern Syrian heritage. 
Ali "Myth" Kabbani, professional gamer who is also an Afro-Syrian
Steve Jobs, co-founder and former CEO of Apple, the largest Disney shareholder, and a member of Disney's Board of Directors. Jobs is considered a leading figure in both the computer and entertainment industries.
Paula Abdul, television personality, jewelry designer, multi-platinum Grammy-winning singer, and Emmy Award-winning choreographer of Jewish descent According to Abdul, she has sold over 53 million records to date. Abdul found renewed fame as a judge on the highly rated television series American Idol.
Victor George "Vic" Atiyeh,(February 20, 1923 – July 20, 2014), 32nd Governor of Oregon from 1979 to 1987, American politician and member of the Republican Party.
F. Murray Abraham, actor who won the Academy Award for Best Actor for his role as Antonio Salieri in the 1984 film Amadeus. His career after Amadeus inspired the name of the phenomenon dubbed "F. Murray Abraham syndrome", attributed to Oscar winners who have difficulty obtaining comparable success and recognition despite having recognizable talent
Moustapha Akkad, film director and producer originally from Aleppo; Akkad is best known for producing the series of Halloween films, and for directing the Lion of the Desert and Mohammad, Messenger of God films.
Tige Andrews, Emmy-nominated character actor who was best known for his role as "Captain Adam Greer" on the television series The Mod Squad.
Najeeb Halaby, former head of Federal Aviation Administration and CEO of Pan-American Airlines, and father of Queen Noor of Jordan
Paul Anka, singer-songwriter. Anka rose to fame after many successful 1950s songs, earning him the status of a teen idol. (Some sources, such as The Canadian Encyclopedia and Time magazine, suggest that Anka is of Syrian descent, while other sources, including Anka's official website, suggest that he is of Lebanese descent.)
Riad Barmada, orthopaedic surgeon
Eddie Antar, founder of Crazy Eddie, of Syrian Jewish descent.
Rosemary Barkett, first woman to serve on the Florida Supreme Court, and the first woman Chief Justice of that court. She subsequently served as a federal judge on the United States Court of Appeals for the Eleventh Circuit, and currently serves as a judge on the Iran–United States Claims Tribunal. The Barkett family originated in the village of Zaidal on the outskirts of Homs.
Rowan Blanchard (born October 14, 2001), actress. Blanchard is Syrian from her paternal grandfather's side.
Malek Jandali, composer and pianist
Justin Amash, U.S. Representative (R-Michigan)
Hayvi Bouzo, journalist and television presenter
Helen Corey, cookbook author who introduced American audiences to Syrian food beginning with her book, The Art of Syrian Cookery (1962)
Mitch Daniels, former Governor of the U.S. state of Indiana (2005–2013) and the current President of Purdue University.
Huda Akil, neuroscientist and medical researcher.
Helen Donath, opera singer.
Shadia Habbal, astronomer and physicist specialized in Space physics
Hunein Maassab, professor of epidemiology and the inventor of the live attenuated influenza vaccine
Wentworth Miller, actor on Prison Break
Hala Gorani, news anchor and correspondent for CNN International.
Rahme Haider, toured the US from the 1910s to the 1930s as "Princess Rahme", speaking on Syria.
Teri Hatcher, actress known for her television roles as Susan Mayer on the ABC comedy-drama series Desperate Housewives, and Lois Lane on Lois & Clark: The New Adventures of Superman. Hatcher is Syrian from her mother's side.
Dan Hedaya, prolific character actor notable for his many Italian American film roles.
Robert M. Isaac, former Republican Mayor of Colorado Springs, Colorado. Elected in 1979, he was the first elected Mayor of the history of Colorado Springs, serving through 1997.
Alan Jabbour, folklorist and musician.
Zuhdi Jasser (born 1967), physician, Muslim reformer, and founder of the American Islamic Forum for Democracy.
Alan Jouban, UFC fighter
Mohja Kahf (born 1967), poet and author
Dina Katabi (born 1971), Professor of Electrical Engineering and Computer Science at MIT and the director of the MIT Wireless Center.
Kurtis Mantronik, hip-hop, electro funk, and dance music artist, DJ, remixer, and producer. Mantronik was the leader of the old-school band Mantronix.
Jack Marshall, author and poet.
Charles Meide, underwater archaeologist and the Director of LAMP at the St. Augustine Lighthouse & Maritime Museum. His ancestors (Meide, originally Maida, and Barket, alternatively spelled Barkett) emigrated from the villages of Fairouzeh and Zaidal near Homs around the turn of the 20th century.
Dean Muhtadi (born July 17, 1986), professional wrestler signed with the WWE under the name "Mojo Rawley".
Brandon Saad (born October 27, 1992), professional ice hockey player for the Chicago Blackhawks. Saad was a finalist in the 2012–13 season for the Calder Memorial Trophy, along with winning the Stanley Cup in 2013, and 2015 with the Blackhawks.
Mahmud Michael Barmada, was an American geneticist from a Syrian descendant. 
Louay M. Safi (born September 15, 1955), scholar and Human Rights activist, and a vocal critic of the Far Right. Author of numerous books and articles, Safi is active in the debate on nuclear race, social and political development, and Islam-West issues. He is the chairman of the Syrian American Congress.
Jerry Seinfeld, comedian, actor, and writer, best known for playing a semi-fictional version of himself in the long-running sitcom Seinfeld, which he co-created and executively produced. His mother was of Syrian Jewish descent, his grandparents emigrating from Aleppo.
Yasser Seirawan, chess grandmaster and 4-time US-champion. Seirawan is the 69th best chess player in the world and the 2nd in the United States.
Mona Simpson, novelist and essayist; Simpson is also the biological sister of Steve Jobs.
Wafa Sultan (born 1958), secular activist and vocal critic of Islam. In 2006, Sultan was chosen by Time magazine to be on the Time 100 list of the 100 most influential people in 2006.
Vic Tayback, actor who won two Golden Globe Awards for his role in the television series Alice.
Lisa Brennan-Jobs, writer 
Fawwaz Ulaby, R. Jamieson and Betty Williams Professor of Electrical Engineering and Computer Science at the University of Michigan, and the former vice president for research.
Diana al-Hadid (born 1981), contemporary Syrian sculptor from Aleppo based in the Brooklyn, New York.
Sam Yagan, American entrepreneur and business executive, co-founder of SparkNotes, eDonkey, OkCupid, and Techstars Chicago, also CEO of Match Group, including Tinder.
Souhel Najjar, neurologist and psychologist whose story with Susannah Cahalan turned into an American Drama Film. He studied medicine in the University of Damascus and in Albany Medical College
Amal Kassir, international award-winning spoken word poet.

See also
Syrian American Council
Syrian Jewish communities of the United States
Syrian Jewish cuisine
Syria–United States relations
Syrian Americans in New York City
Syrian Jews

Notes

References

External links 
Syrian American Woman's Association (nonprofit NGO)
Syrian American Council

 
 
 
 
Syrian diaspora in North America
Arab American
Middle Eastern American